Desulfovibrio arcticus  is a Gram-negative, psychrotolerant, sulfate-reducing and motile bacterium from the genus of Desulfovibrio with a single polar flagellum which has been isolated from water from permafrost from the Barents Sea.

References

External links
Type strain of Desulfovibrio arcticus at BacDive -  the Bacterial Diversity Metadatabase	

Bacteria described in 2012
Psychrophiles
Desulfovibrio